
Gmina Kobiór is a rural gmina (administrative district) in Pszczyna County, Silesian Voivodeship, in southern Poland.

Neighbouring gminas
Gmina Kobiór is bordered by the towns of Orzesze and Tychy, and by the gminas of Bojszowy, Pszczyna, Suszec and Wyry.

Twin towns – sister cities

Gmina Kobiór is twinned with:
 Dobšiná, Slovakia
 Sajószentpéter, Hungary
 Šternberk, Czech Republic

References

Kobior
Pszczyna County